Herlev Idrætsforening – Fodbold is a Danish football club located in the northwestern Copenhagen suburb, Herlev. The club's senior team participates in the Denmark Series and is member of the local association DBU Zealand under the Danish Football Association (DBU). Their home ground is Herlev Stadium. The football team functions as a subdivision of the multi-sports club Herlev Idrætsforening (HI), since 1949 HI has been an umbrella organisation for almost all sports clubs in Herlev Municipality. The sports club has over 600 members.

External links
 Official site

Football clubs in Denmark
Association football clubs established in 1923
1923 establishments in Denmark